Isaac Henry Pratt was anIrish Anglican priest: he was Archdeacon of Clogher from 1937 until 1957.

Pratt was educated at Trinity College, Dublin and ordained deacon in 1903 and priest in 1904. After a curacy in Bohoe he was the incumbent at Rossory. From 1919 he wa also Rural Dean of Enniskillen.

Pratt died on 6 March 1957.

References

Archdeacons of Clogher
Alumni of Trinity College Dublin
20th-century Irish Anglican priests
1957 deaths